The 64th General Assembly of Prince Edward Island is the 64th sitting of the Legislative Assembly of Prince Edward Island and the 38th since confederation in 1873. The assembly was elected on October 3, 2011 with a landslide re-election for Robert Ghiz and the Liberals. Ghiz resigned as premier on February 23, 2015 and was succeeded by Wade MacLauchlan, who wasn't a member of the 64th General Assembly.

Members

The Speaker of the Legislative Assembly (Carolyn Bertram) is designated by a dagger.

 Changed Affiliation on October 3, 2013
 Expelled from Caucus on October 4, 2013
 Resigned as an MLA on February 23, 2015
 Resigned as an MLA on February 24, 2015
 Resigned as an MLA on February 23, 2015

Party membership

Membership changes

See also
List of Prince Edward Island General Assemblies

External links
The Legislative Assembly of Prince Edward Island, government website

Terms of the General Assembly of Prince Edward Island
2011 establishments in Prince Edward Island
21st century in Prince Edward Island